Thomas Edison High School is the only public high school in the Northeast community of Minneapolis, Minnesota, United States. It was named after the American inventor Thomas Alva Edison. Located in the Holland neighborhood, the school's academic focus areas are: American Studies, Business Enterprise, Candidate International Baccalaureate Middle Years Programme, International Baccalaureate Diploma Programme, Personal Care & Therapeutic Services, and Technology & Multi Media.

The school opened in 1922. Additions have been made to the rear of the building, and a gymnasium was built across Monroe Street. The track and football field are behind this gym, and the school's baseball/softball field is in adjacent Jackson Square Park.

Demographics
The demographic breakdown of the 958 students enrolled for 2017-18 was:
Male - 50.0%
Female - 50.0%
Native American/Alaskan - 4.5%
Asian/Pacific islanders - 5.2%
Black - 53.0%
Hispanic - 19.1%
White - 16.7%
Multiracial - 1.5%

72.1% of the students were eligible for free or reduced lunch.

Athletics
Edison competes in the following sports, some in co-ops with other schools.

 Fall: Football, Cross Country Running, Girls Tennis, Boys and Girls Soccer, Volleyball, Girls Swimming 
 Winter: Dance Team, Wrestling, Boys Swimming, Boys and Girls Basketball, Gymnastics, Boys and Girls Hockey
 Spring: Track and Field, Boys Tennis, Baseball, Badminton, Softball, Boys and Girls Golf

Notable alumni
Alan Anderson, basketball player
Don A. Anderson, Minnesota state senator
John Billman, football player
Don Carlson, basketball player
Joe Dziedzic, professional hockey player
Kari Dziedzic, Minnesota state senator
Stanley J. Fudro, Minnesota state representative, businessman, and toy inventor
Tony Jaros, basketball player
Raymond J. Julkowski, Minnesota state representative and lawyer
Harold Kalina, Minnesota State Senator, Minnesota District Court Judge
Mesa Kincaid, radio personality
Richard E. Kraus, Marine Corps Medal of Honor recipient
John S. Kozlak, Minnesota state representative
Diane Loeffler, Minnesota state representative
Mike Mikulak, football player
Ilhan Omar, U.S. Representative
Anne K. Stokowski, Minnesota state senator
Eugene E. Stokowski, Minnesota state senator
Clayton Tonnemaker, football player

References

External links

 Edison home page

Educational institutions established in 1922
High schools in Minneapolis
Minneapolis Public Schools
Public high schools in Minnesota
International Baccalaureate schools in Minnesota
1922 establishments in Minnesota